James Francis Keane (August 8, 1934 – April 12, 2020) was an American politician and educator.

Keane was born in Chicago, Illinois and graduated from Archbishop Quigley Preparatory Seminary. Keane served in the United States Army. He graduated from Loyola University Chicago, University of Chicago, Roosevelt University, and Nova Southeastern University. He taught at Leo Catholic High School from 1961 to 1968 and at University of Chicago from 1972 to 1975. He also worked for the City of Chicago as director of resource mobilization from 1970 to 1972. Keane served in the Illinois House of Representatives from 1979 to 1992 and was a Democrat. He died in Chicago, Illinois.

Notes

1934 births
2020 deaths
Politicians from Chicago
Military personnel from Illinois
Loyola University Chicago alumni
Roosevelt University alumni
Nova Southeastern University alumni
University of Chicago alumni
University of Chicago faculty
Democratic Party members of the Illinois House of Representatives